Igor Saveljić (born 17 August 1995) is a Montenegrin tennis player.

Saveljić has a career high ATP singles ranking of 1340 achieved on 13 July 2015. He also has a career high ATP doubles ranking of 1183 achieved on 16 March 2020.

Saveljić represents Montenegro at the Davis Cup, where he has a W/L record of 9–10.

Doubles 1 (0–1)

Davis Cup

Participations: (9–10)

   indicates the outcome of the Davis Cup match followed by the score, date, place of event, the zonal classification and its phase, and the court surface.

External links

1995 births
Living people
Montenegrin male tennis players
Sportspeople from Podgorica
NC State Wolfpack men's tennis players